Thomas Miller House is a registered historic building near Elizabethtown, Ohio, listed in the National Register on November 2, 2000.

Historic uses 
Single Dwelling
Agricultural Outbuildings

Notes 

Houses on the National Register of Historic Places in Ohio
National Register of Historic Places in Hamilton County, Ohio
Houses in Hamilton County, Ohio